Clackson is a surname. Notable people with the surname include:

Chris Clackson (born 1987), American ice hockey player
James Clackson (born 1966), British linguist
Kim Clackson (born 1955), Canadian ice hockey player
Matt Clackson (born 1985), Canadian-born American ice hockey player
Sarah Clackson (1965–2003), British Coptologist
William Clackson (c.1799–?), Scottish shoemaker and revolutionary